Minarets is a former settlement in Madera County, California.

A post office operated at Minarets from 1925 to 1933. Minarets was the terminus of the Minarets and Western Railroad.

The name Minarets was applied to a geologic feature in the county; see Minarets (California).

References

Former settlements in Madera County, California
Former populated places in California